Luke's Double is a 1916 American short comedy film featuring Harold Lloyd. It was believed to be a lost film. However, in October 2022, a 28-mm print of the film has been recovered by the Harold Lloyd Estate and has been deposited at the UCLA Film & Television Archive for eventual preservation

Cast
 Harold Lloyd as Lonesome Luke
 Bebe Daniels
 Snub Pollard
 Gaylord Lloyd as Luke's Double
 Sammy Brooks
 Bud Jamison
 Charles Stevenson

See also
Harold Lloyd filmography
List of rediscovered films

References

External links

Luke's Double at SilentEra

1916 films
1916 comedy films
1916 short films
American silent short films
American black-and-white films
Films directed by Hal Roach
Rediscovered American films
Silent American comedy films
Lonesome Luke films
American comedy short films
1910s American films
1910s rediscovered films